Anne Meulendijks (born 30 July 1993) is a Dutch dressage rider. She won team silver during the 2019 European Championships in Rotterdam with her horse MDH Avanti. She also won several medals at the European youth Championships in the Ponies, Juniors, Young Riders and U25 division.

Biography
Meulendijks was born in Heeze in the Dutch province North Brabant. Together with her younger sister Lotte Meulendijks they run their own dressage stable in Heeze.

References

External links
 

Living people
1993 births
Dutch female equestrians
Dutch dressage riders
Sportspeople from Heeze-Leende
21st-century Dutch women